Ubiquitin specific peptidase 9, Y-linked (fat facets-like, Drosophila), also known as USP9Y, is an enzyme which in humans is encoded by the USP9Y gene. It is required for sperm production. This enzyme is a member of the peptidase C19 family and is similar to ubiquitin-specific proteases, which cleave the ubiquitin moiety from ubiquitin-fused precursors and ubiquitinylated proteins.

Clinical significance 

Mutations in this gene have been associated with Sertoli cell-only syndrome (SCO) and male infertility.

The USP9Y gene is found on the azoospermia factor (AZF) region on the Y chromosome. Men who have impaired or no sperm production often have a deletion in the AZF region, especially in the USP9Y gene, and it was thought that USP9Y was necessary for sperm production. However, a man and his father with a USP9Y deletion who could produce sperm were recently reported. The corresponding gene is present but inactive in chimpanzees and bonobos.

References

Further reading